Yuni may refer to:

Yuni (film), 2021 internationally co-produced drama film
Yuni, Hokkaido, a town in Sorachi Subprefecture, Hokkaido, Japan
Yuni Station, a railway station in Yuni
Yuni Shara (born 1972), Indonesian singer
Yuni (Star Twinkle PreCure), a character in the anime series Star Twinkle PreCure
YuNi, Japanese virtual singer mainly works on YouTube, Japan

See also
 Yuny (disambiguation)